Deedar may refer to:

Deedar (1951 film), a 1951 Bollywood Hindi language film
Deedar (1970 film), a 1970 Bollywood Hindi language film
Deedar (1992 film), a 1992 Hindi film
Deedar (actress) (born 1980), Pakistani stand-up comedian, dancer and actress

See also
Di-Dar, an album by Faye Wong